The Yakovlev Yak-50 aerobatic aircraft is a single-seat all-metal low-wing monoplane with retractable main wheels and exposed tail wheel. The control surfaces are fabric-covered to save weight. The aircraft is not equipped with flaps.

The supercharged engine may be the Vedeneyev M14P (standard production line version), M14PF or M14R, producing between 360 and 450 hp and driving the propeller via a reduction gearbox. The landing gear, brakes and engine starter are operated by compressed air. Replenished by an engine-driven compressor, the main and emergency air bottles are contained within the forward fuselage between the firewall and fuel tanks.

The Yak-50 has fine handling characteristics enhanced by a relatively high power-to-weight ratio. It has a tough and agile airframe - the type was twice World Aerobatic Champion. It has been used as a military trainer by several countries.

Aircraft serving with the Soviet National Aerobatic team were typically scrapped after about 50 flight hours, due to the intense stresses imposed on the airframe during unlimited aerobatics. There were numerous cases of main spar failure; among its victims were the 1976 World Aerobatic Champion Viktor Letsko and many others.

Two modifications (Service Bulletin 61DA for S/N 0102-2007 and Service Bulletin 79 for S/N 1201-2806) were made to strengthen the wings spars for the extreme loads experienced during unlimited aerobatics, and no further failures occurred.

Other aircraft serving with DOSAAF were "officially" scrapped or placed into storage after they were superseded by the Yak-55 and Su-26.

It is these aircraft that form the bulk of airworthy "survivors" today. Only a few (approx. 90+) are airworthy and remain in private hands in Europe, the USA, Australia and Canada.

Operators

Lithuanian National Defence Volunteer Forces - Ex DOSAAF aircraft

 DOSAAF Russia

 DOSAAF Ukraine

 DOSAAF

Specifications

References

Aerobatic aircraft
1970s Soviet sport aircraft
Single-engined tractor aircraft
Low-wing aircraft
Aircraft first flown in 1975